Watertown Public Schools is a school district headquartered in Watertown, Massachusetts.

Circa 2019 the district had almost 2,600 students.

Schools
Secondary:
 Watertown High School (WHS)
 Watertown Middle School (WMS)
Elementary:
 Cunniff
 Hosmer
 Lowell
    
Preschool:
 Early Steps Preschool

References

External links
 Watertown Public Schools

School districts in Massachusetts
Watertown, Massachusetts
Education in Middlesex County, Massachusetts